Spider is the nickname of:

Edward Dawson Atkinson (1891–?), British First World War flying ace
Woody Brown (surfer) (1912–2008), American surfer and watercraft designer
Albert Buick (1875–1948), Scottish footballer
Matthew Burton (Australian footballer) (born 1970), retired Australian rules footballer
Panagiotis Fasoulas (born 1963), Greek politician and former basketball player
Dallas Green (baseball) (born 1934), American Major League Baseball pitcher, manager and executive
Rachid Harkouk (born 1956), Anglo-Algerian former footballer
Spider Johnson (1907–1966), American football player
Zeljko Kalac (born 1972), Australian football goalkeeper and coach
Billy Kelly (boxer) (1932–2010), boxer from Northern Ireland
Jim Kelly (boxer) (1912–?), boxer from Northern Ireland
John Koerner, American blues/folk musician
Carl "Spider" Lockhart (1943–1986), American National Football League player
Spider Matlock (1901–1936), American stuntman and racing mechanic
William L. Nyland (born 1946), retired US Marine Corps four-star general
Spider Robinson (born  1948), science fiction writer
Spider Sabich (1945–1976), American alpine ski racer
Anderson Silva (born 1975), Brazilian mixed martial arts fighter
Spider Stacy (born 1958), English musician and member of The Pogues
Darius Watts (born 1981), American former National Football League and arena football player
Travis Webb (1910–1990), American race car driver
Mark Webster (darts player) (born 1983), Welsh darts player 
Julián Álvarez (footballer) (born 2000), Argentine former footballer

See also
Donovan Mitchell (born 1996), American National Basketball Association player nicknamed "Spida"
Louis XI of France (1423–1483), King of France known as "l'universelle aragne" ("the Universal Spider")
Toni Kukoč (born 1968), Croatian retired National Basketball Association player nicknamed "the Spider from Split"
Alain Robert (born 1962), French rock climber and urban climber nicknamed "the Human Spider"
Roberto Vásquez (born 1983), Panamanian boxer nicknamed "La Araña" ("The Spider")
Lev Yashin (1929–1990), Soviet-Russian football goalkeeper nicknamed "The Black Spider"
Fabio Cudicini (born 1936), Italian retired football goalkeeper nicknamed "Ragno Nero" ("Black Spider")
Cesare Maestri (born 1929), Italian mountaineer and writer nicknamed the "Spider of the Dolomites"
Peter Everitt (born 1974), Australian rules footballer nicknamed "Spida"
Spider-Man (nickname)
Neil Giraldo (born 1955), American guitar musician nicknamed "Spyder"

Lists of people by nickname